Haut-Lomami District was a district of the pre-2015 Katanga Province in the Democratic Republic of the Congo. 
The district dates back to the days of the Belgian Congo. 
At its greatest extent it roughly corresponded to the northern part of the current Lualaba Province and to the present Haut-Lomami Province.

Belgian Congo

The original four provinces of the Belgian Congo had considerable autonomy, but in 1933 they were reorganized into six provinces, named after their capitals, and the central government assumed more control.
Katanga became Elisabethville Province.
The number of districts in the colony was reduced to 15.
Elisabethville Province was divided into Lualaba District in the west, and Tanganika District and Haut-Katanga District in the east.

By 1955 Lualaba had been greatly reduced in size, with the northern part of the district split off as Haut-Lomami District and part of the east transferred to Luapula-Moero District.
A 1955–1957 map shows Haut-Lomami District bordered by Lulua District and Kabinda District to the north, Tanganika District to the northeast., Luapula-Moero District to the southeast, Lualaba District to the south and Portuguese territories to the west.

Post-independence

On 11 July 1960, a few days after the Congo Republic had gained independence, the province of Katanga seceded as an independent state.
In November 1961 the northern portion was reconquered by the national government and made the province of Nord-Katanga.
On 21 January 1963 the remainder of Katanga was reconquered and divided into the provinces of Lualaba and Katanga Oriental.
Nord-Katanga, Lualaba and Katanga Oriental were merged back into the province of Katanga on 28 December 1966.
In 2015 Haut-Lomami Province was formed from Haut-Lomami district, whose town of Kamina was elevated to capital city of the new province.

Gallery

See also

 Districts of the Congo Free State
 Districts of the Belgian Congo
 Districts of the Democratic Republic of the Congo

References

Sources

 

Districts of the Congo Free State
Districts of the Belgian Congo
Lualaba Province
Districts of Katanga Province